Hagenbrunn is a town in the district of Korneuburg in Lower Austria in Austria.

Geography
It lies north of Bisamberg in the Weinviertel in Lower Austria. About 4.41 percent of the municipality is forested.

References

External links
 Hagenbrunn Homepage

Cities and towns in Korneuburg District